The 1934 NCAA Wrestling Championships were the 7th NCAA Wrestling Championships to be held. The University of Michigan in Ann Arbor, Michigan hosted the tournament at Yost Fieldhouse.

Oklahoma A&M took home the team championship with 29 points and three individual champions.

Ben Bishop of Lehigh was named the Outstanding Wrestler.

Team results

Individual finals

References

NCAA Division I Wrestling Championship
Wrestling competitions in the United States
1934 in American sports
1934 in Indiana
Sports in Ann Arbor, Michigan